Flora Hyacinth (born 10 March 1966 in St. Lucia) is a retired female track and field athlete from the United States Virgin Islands who specialized in the long jump and triple jump.

Career

Earlier in her career, especially while competing for the Crimson Tide Track and Field Team at the University of Alabama, she also competed in the triple jump and hurdles.  On May 17, 1987, at a meet in Tuscaloosa, Alabama, U.S., Flora surpassed the world record in the triple jump with a jump of 13.73 metres, but the feat could not be given official recognition because the meet officials lacked appropriate measuring tools.  Yet, she is still included on unofficial world record progression lists. While at the University of Alabama, she became a member of Zeta Phi Beta sorority in 1986 through the Iota Eta chapter.

Personal life

After pursuing her athletic career, Hyacinth went on to pursue a career as a chiropractor.  Hyacinth currently practices at her own clinic in San Diego, California.

Personal bests
400 metres - 54.70 s (1985)
100 metres hurdles - 13.33 s (1987)
400 metres hurdles - 57.55 s (1986)
Long jump - 6.72 m (1998)
Triple jump - 13.73 m (1987)

Achievements

References

External links

1966 births
Living people
United States Virgin Islands triple jumpers
United States Virgin Islands female sprinters
United States Virgin Islands long jumpers
United States Virgin Islands female hurdlers
Athletes (track and field) at the 1991 Pan American Games
Athletes (track and field) at the 1999 Pan American Games
Pan American Games competitors for the United States Virgin Islands
Athletes (track and field) at the 1992 Summer Olympics
Athletes (track and field) at the 1996 Summer Olympics
Athletes (track and field) at the 2000 Summer Olympics
Olympic track and field athletes of the United States Virgin Islands
Alabama Crimson Tide women's track and field athletes
Female triple jumpers
Female long jumpers
Competitors at the 1986 Central American and Caribbean Games
Competitors at the 1998 Central American and Caribbean Games
Central American and Caribbean Games gold medalists for the United States Virgin Islands
Central American and Caribbean Games bronze medalists for the United States Virgin Islands
Central American and Caribbean Games medalists in athletics